A referendum on the Act of Union with the Kingdom of Denmark was held in Iceland on 19 October 1918. Voters were asked whether they approved of the Act, which would lead to Iceland becoming a separate kingdom under the Danish Crown, making the country a sovereign state in a personal union with Denmark. It was approved by 92.6% of voters.

Results

References

Referendums in Iceland
1918 referendums
1918 in Iceland
1918 in international relations
Iceland
Iceland
October 1918 events